The 1926-27 season in Swedish football, starting August 1926 and ending July 1927:

Honours

Official titles

Competitions

Promotions, relegations and qualifications

Promotions

Relegations

Domestic results

Allsvenskan 1926–27

Allsvenskan promotion play-off 1926–27

Division 2 Uppsvenska Serien 1926–27

Division 2 Mellansvenska Serien 1926–27

Division 2 Östsvenska Serien 1926–27

Division 2 Västsvenska Serien 1926–27

Division 2 Sydsvenska Serien 1926–27

Norrländska Mästerskapet 1927 
Final

National team results 

 Sweden: 

 Sweden: 

 Sweden: 

 Sweden: 

 Sweden: 

 Sweden: 

 Sweden: 

 Sweden: 

 Sweden: 

 Sweden:

National team players in season 1926/27

Notes

References 
Print

Online

 
Seasons in Swedish football